Boris Anatolevich Nartsissov (14 February 1906 – 27 November 1982) was a Russian émigré poet.

Biography 
Nartsissov was born in the small village of Naskaftym (Russian:Наскафтым) in the Saratov Governorate to a family of medical doctors. During the Russian Civil War, his family fled to Estonia in 1919, where he studied at the University of Tartu and received a degree in chemistry. During World War II, he was moved to a displaced persons camp near Munich. After the end of the war, he lived in Tübingen until 1949, when he moved to Australia while working for the U.S. government as a chemist. From 1953 to 1959, he lived in Columbus, Ohio, after which he moved to Washington, D.C., where he remained until his death.

While living in the U.S., Nartsissov published six volumes of poetry and one short novel. He translated from both Estonian and English into Russian. His literary themes include mysticism, the supernatural, and the double. He favored ternary metres, particularly anapaestic.

Selected publications 
1958 Stikhi (Стихи); "Poems"

1961 Golosa (Голоса); "Voices"

1965 Pamjat''' (Память); "Memory"

1969 Pod'jom (Подъём); "Ascent"

1974 Shakhmaty (Шахматы); "Chess"

1978 Zvjozdnaja Ptitsa (Звёздная птица); "Star Bird"

1983 Pis'mo Samomu Sebe (Письмо самому себе)''; "A Letter to Myself"

References 

1906 births
1982 deaths
University of Tartu alumni
Estonian emigrants to the United States
20th-century American poets
American male poets
20th-century American male writers